The Republic of China (ROC), commonly known as Taiwan, is governed in a framework of a representative democratic republic under a five-power system first envisioned by Sun Yat-sen in 1906, whereby under the constitutional amendments, the President is head of state and the Premier (President of the Executive Yuan) is head of government, and of a multi-party system. Executive power is exercised by the government. Legislative power is vested in primarily with the parliament and limited by government. The judiciary is independent of the executive and the legislature. In addition, the civil service's powers is being in charge of validating the qualification of civil servants and the supervision auditory power inspects, reviews, and audits the policies and operations of the government. The party system is dominated by two parties, the Kuomintang (KMT), which broadly favors closer links to mainland China and the status quo, and the Democratic Progressive Party (DPP), which broadly favors Taiwanese nationalism and independence.

Ever since the de facto end of the Chinese Civil War and the retreat of the government of the Republic of China to Taiwan, the modern-day ROC, or the "free area", currently consists of Taiwan, Penghu, portions of the Fujian Province (Kinmen and Matsu) and several smaller islands, including Taiping Island in the South China Sea. The ROC's six major cities, Kaohsiung, New Taipei, Taichung, Tainan, Taipei, and Taoyuan, are special municipalities. The rest of the territories are divided into 3 cities and 13 counties. Overall, the country is nominally de jure subdivided into 35 provinces, 1 special administrative region, 2 regions, and 18 special municipalities.

Prior to the constitutional reforms in 1991, the political system of the ROC took place in a framework of a parliamentary representative democratic republic, where the President served a primarily ceremonial role as Head of State. Executive power was exercised by the government. Legislative power is formerly vested in both the government and its tricameral parliament: the National Assembly where it elects the President and Vice-President as well as make major constitutional amendments, the Control Yuan and the Legislative Yuan. 

Historically, the ROC political system under the Dang Guo regime and the martial law under the climate of White Terror period was authoritarian whereby political opposition was harshly suppressed, all religious activity was controlled by the KMT, dissent was not permitted and civil rights were curtailed. After democratization in the 1990s, all political parties became legal and the Republic of China was democratized where free speech and civil rights became gradually relaxed.

Overview 

The ROC is governed under the Constitution of the Republic of China which was drafted in 1947 before the fall of the Chinese mainland to the Chinese Communist Party (CCP) and outlined a government for all of China. Significant amendments were made to the Constitution in 1991, and there have been a number of judicial interpretations made to take into account the fact that the Constitution covers a much smaller area than originally envisioned.

The government in Taipei officially asserts to be the sole legitimate government of all of China, which it defined as including Taiwan, mainland China, and outer Mongolia. In keeping with that claim, when the KMT fled to Taipei in 1949, they re-established the full array of central political bodies, which had existed in mainland China in the de jure capital of Nanjing (Nanking). While much of this structure remains in place, the President Lee Teng-hui in 1991 unofficially abandoned the government's claim of sovereignty over mainland China, stating that they do not "dispute the fact that the Communists control mainland China." However, the National Assembly has not officially changed the national borders, as doing so may be seen as a prelude to formal Taiwanese independence. The People's Republic of China has several times threatened to start a war if the government of Taiwan formalizes independence; as in the Anti-Secession Law. Neither the National Assembly nor the Supreme Court has actually defined what the term "existing national boundaries," as stated in the constitution, actually means. The latter refused to do so claiming that it is a "major political issue".

Political history

Taiwan under Japanese rule

After the First Sino-Japanese War, China were forced to cede the island of Formosa to Japan. Under Japanese rule, Taiwan has its governor general as its head of government under the constitutional monarchy led by the Emperor. Taiwanese citizens in Formosa and Pescadores were Japanese citizens until the end of World War II in 1945.

Republic of China on Mainland China, 1911–1949

The original founding of the Republic centered on the Three Principles of the People: nationalism, democracy, and people's livelihood. Nationalism meant the Chinese people standing up against Manchu rule and Japanese and Western interference, democracy meant elected rule modeled after Japan's parliament, and people's livelihood or socialism, meant government regulation of the means of production. Another lesser known principle that the Republic was founded upon was five races under one union (五族共和), which emphasized the harmony of the five major ethnic groups in China as represented by the colored stripes of the original Five-Colored Flag of the Republic. However, this "five races under one union" principle and the corresponding flag were abandoned in 1927.

In reality the three original principles were left unrealized. Republican China was marked by warlordism, foreign invasion, and civil war. Although there were elected legislators from its inception, it was actually a largely one-party dictatorship apart from some minor parties, including the Chinese Youth Party, the National Socialist Party and the Rural Construction Party, with suppression of dissent of communists within the KMT. As the central government was quite weak, little could be done in terms of land reform or redistribution of wealth. Politics of this era consisted primarily of the political and military struggle between the KMT and the CCP in between bouts of active resistance against Japanese invasion.

Political structure
The first national government of the Chinese Republic was established on 1 January 1912, in Nanjing, with Sun Yat-sen as the provisional president. Provincial delegates were sent to confirm the authority of the national government, and they later also formed the first parliament. The power of this national government was both limited and short-lived, with generals controlling all of central and northern China. The limited acts passed by this government included the formal abdication of the Qing dynasty and some economic initiatives.

Shortly after the rise of Yuan Shikai, the parliament's authority became nominal; violations of the Constitution by Yuan were met with half-hearted motions of censure, and KMT members of the parliament that gave up their membership to the KMT were offered 1,000 pounds. Yuan maintained power locally by sending military generals to be provincial governors or by obtaining the allegiance of those already in power. Foreign powers came to recognize Yuan's power as well: when Japan came to China with Twenty-One Demands, it was Yuan that submitted to them, on 25 May 1915.

After the death of Yuan in 1916, the parliament of 1913 was reconvened to give legitimacy to a new government. However, the real power of the time passed to military leaders, forming the warlord period. Still, the powerless government had its use—when World War I began, several Western powers and Japan wanted China to declare war on Germany, in order to liquidate the latter's holdings there.

From the beginning to the end of Republican China, political power was generally exercised through both legal and non-legal means. Yuan ruled as a dictator, remolding the constitution as he saw fit; warlords withdrew from the Republic, ruling through military control; and Chiang based his political power on military power. During this time, Chiang ruled more as a dictator than as a leader of a one-party state. He used white terror tactics and various military campaigns to destroy the CCP, and the police and military apparatus were freely used to attack dissenters. However, Chiang's influence never extended beyond the Yangtze Delta, and the rest of the country was under the effective control of former warlords, and Chiang faced insurrections from them throughout the 1930s, even after the Northern Expedition, which had nominally unified the country. Regional political power remained strong throughout Republican China, and central authority deteriorated continuously until the Second Sino-Japanese War, to the point that Chiang became no more than the "head of a loose coalition," as observed by Albert Wedemeyer.

Republic of China on Taiwan since 1949

After the death of Chiang Kai-shek in 1975, Vice President Yen Chia-kan briefly took over from 1975 to 1978, according to the Constitution, but the actual power was in the hands of Premier Chiang Ching-kuo, who was KMT chairman and a son of Chang Kai-shek. During the presidency of Chiang Ching-kuo from 1978 to 1988, Taiwan's political system began to undergo gradual liberalization.

After the lifting of martial law, the opposition Democratic Progressive Party (民主進步黨) was formed and allowed to participate overtly in politics. After Chiang Ching-kuo died in 1988, Vice President Lee Teng-hui (李登輝) succeeded him as the first Taiwan-born president and chairman of the KMT. Lee became the first ROC president elected by popular vote in 1996, despite the PRC's missile tests.

In 2000, Chen Shui-bian (陳水扁) of the pro-independence Democratic Progressive Party (DPP) was elected president, marking the first peaceful democratic transition of power to an opposition party in ROC history and a decisive end to the KMT's monopoly in administration of the central government.

In the 2004 presidential election, the day after being shot while campaigning, Chen was reelected by a narrow margin of 0.2%. The KMT filed lawsuits to demand a recount, alleged voting fraud and staged huge rallies to demand a new election. The courts ruled that the election was accurate and valid.

In both of Chen's terms, the DPP and the independence-leaning Pan-Green Coalition failed to secure a majority in the legislature, losing to the KMT and the pro-unification leaning Pan-Blue Coalition. This has led to many impasses; the president in the ROC system does not have the power of veto, so the legislature is not required to obtain the assent of the executive branch in order to make laws.

In January 2008, opposition party Kuomintang won a landslide victory in legislative election. President Chen Shui-bian's Democratic Progressive Party (DPP) lost. In March 2008, Ma Ying-jeou of Kuomintang party was elected as president. In January 2012, President Ma Ying-jeou was re-elected. In January 2016, Democratic Progressive Party candidate Tsai Ing-wen won presidential election. She became the first female president of Republic of China. In January 2020, Tsai was re-elected, and in the simultaneous legislative election, President Tsai's Democratic Progressive Party (DPP) won a majority, with 61 out of 113 seats. The Kuomintang (KMT) got 38 seats.

In the 21st century, Taiwan's political system has been moving towards digital democracy with increased participation from civil society and greater transparency from the government.

Political status and the major camps  

One key issue has been the political status of Taiwan itself. With the diplomatic isolation brought about in the 1970s and 1980s, the notion of "recovering the mainland" by force has been dropped and the Taiwanese localization movement strengthened. The relationship with the People's Republic of China and the related issues of Taiwan independence and Chinese unification continue to dominate Taiwanese politics.

The political scene in the ROC is divided into two camps, with the pro-unification KMT, People First Party (PFP), and New Party forming the Pan-Blue Coalition; and the Democratic Progressive Party (DPP) and strongly pro-independence Taiwan Solidarity Union (TSU) forming the Pan-Green Coalition. Because of the dominance of the unification-independence issue in Taiwan's political scene, it is difficult to categorise either camp as "right" or "left" on the conventional basis of economic or social policies.

Supporters of the Pan-Green camp tend to favor emphasizing the Republic of China as being a distinct country from the People's Republic of China. Many Pan-Green supporters seek formal Taiwan independence and for dropping the title of the Republic of China. However, more progressive members of the coalition, such as former President Chen Shui-bian, have moderated their views and claim that it is unnecessary to proclaim independence because Taiwan is already "an independent, sovereign country" and that the Republic of China is the same as Taiwan. Some members take a much more extreme view about Taiwan's status, claiming that the ROC is nonexistent and calling for the establishment of an independent "Republic of Taiwan". Supporters of this idea have even gone as far as issuing self-made "passports" for their republic. Attempts to use these "passports" however, have been stopped by officials at Chang Kai-shek International Airport.

While the Pan-Green camp favors Taiwan having an identity separate from that of China, some Pan-Blue members, especially former leaders from the older generation, seem to be strongly supportive of the concept of the Republic of China, which remains an important symbol of their links with China. During his visit to mainland China in April 2005, former KMT Party Chairman Lien Chan reiterated his party's belief in the "One China" policy that states that there is only one China controlled by two governments and that Taiwan is a part of China. PFP Party Chair James Soong expressed the same sentiments during his visit in May. In contrast to the positions of these two leaders of the older generation, the more mainstream Pan-Blue position is to pursue negotiations with the PRC to immediately open direct transportation links with China and to lift investment restrictions. With regards to independence, the mainstream Pan-Blue position is to simply maintain the ROC's current state, and being open to negotiations for unification after China is democratized enough to respect human rights.

For its part, the PRC has indicated that it finds a Republic of China far more acceptable than an independent Taiwan. Ironically, although it views the ROC as an illegitimate entity, it has stated that any effort on Taiwan to formally abolish the ROC or formally renounce its claim over mainland China would result in a strong and possibly military reaction. However, the defense of Taiwan by the US and Japan is likely, so it is not, in reality, clear what the PRC reaction would be. The US's current position is that the Taiwan issue must be resolved peacefully and that it condemns unilateral action by either side, an unprovoked invasion by China or a declaration of formal independence by Taiwan.

Current political issues 

The dominant political issue today in the Taiwan Area in the Republic of China (ROC) is its relationship with the Government of the People’s Republic of China (PRC) that has jurisdiction over Mainland China. Specifically, many people in Taiwan desire the opening of direct transportation links with mainland China, including direct flights, which would aid many Taiwanese businesses that have opened factories or branches in mainland China. The former DPP administration feared that such links will lead to tighter economic and thus political integration with the PRC, and in the 2006 Lunar New Year Speech, Chen Shui-bian called for managed opening of links.

Mainland China and Taiwan resumed regular direct flights or cross-Strait relations on 4 July 2008, after six decades, as a "new start" in their tense relations. Liu Shaoyong, chair of China Southern Airlines, piloted the first flight from Guangzhou to Taipei (Taoyuan International Airport). Simultaneously, a Taiwan-based China Airlines flight flew to Shanghai. Five mainland Chinese cities will be connected with eight Taiwan airports, with 4 days a week, 36 round-trip flights across the Taiwan Strait, thereby eliminating time-consuming Hong Kong stopovers. Other major political issues include the passage of an arms procurement bill that the United States authorized in 2001. In 2008, however, the United States were reluctant to send over more arms to Taiwan out of fear that it would hinder the recent improvement of ties between China and Taiwan. Another major political issue, is the establishment of a National Communications Commission to take over from the Government Information Office, whose advertising budget exercised great control over the media.

Banking reform, including consumer finance (limiting rates on credit cards) and bank mergers, is also a major issue. Taiwan's financial sector is quite unwieldy, with over 48 banks, none of which have a market share over 10%. In addition, the government controls 50% to 60% of Taiwan's banking assets. The ultimate aim is the creation of large financial institutions that will then have the ability to compete internationally.

The politicians and their parties have themselves become major political issues. Corruption among some DPP administration officials has been exposed. In early 2006, President Chen Shui-bian was linked to possible corruption. The political effect on President Chen Shui-bian was great, causing a divide in the DPP leadership and supporters alike. It eventually led to the creation of a political camp led by ex-DPP leader Shih Ming-teh which believes the president should resign. The KMT assets continue to be another major issue, as it was once the richest political party in the world. Nearing the end of 2006, KMT's chairman Ma Ying-jeou was also hit by corruption controversies, although he has since then been cleared of any wrong-doings by the courts. Since completing his second term as President, Chen Shui-bian has been charged with corruption and money laundering.

The merger of the KMT and People First Party (PFP) was thought to be certain, but a string of defections from the PFP to the KMT have increased tensions within the Pan-Blue camp.

In 2006, due to the Pacific Sogo Department Store scandal, the pro-KMT Pan-Blue Coalition moved to impeach the President but failed to obtain the requisite number of votes in the legislature. This failure led to a "Down Ah-Bian" campaign, which sought to pressure the president to resign from office. The campaign began on 1 September 2006. Campaign organizers claimed that the first day of the strike attracted 300,000 people in Taipei, while the police estimated the number to be closer to 90,000. The "Down Ah-Bian" event was being led by activist and politician Shih Ming-te (施明德) as a peaceful sit-in around the capital, besieging the presidential residence. While the protests have been largely peaceful, there have been isolated incidences of violence associated with the campaign, including fist fights between Pan-Blue and Pan-Green (pro-DPP) legislatures. The "Up Ah-Bian" event was organized to counteract the "Down Ah-Bian" campaign. On 13 October 2006, the Pan-Blue Coalition attempted again to pass a recall motion against the ROC President Chen Shui-bian, which also failed to garner sufficient votes in the legislature.

On 3 November 2006, prosecutors in Taiwan stated that they have enough evidence to indict Chen's wife on corruption charges in connection with her handling of a secret diplomatic fund. According to the prosecutors, while Chen would not be indicted while in office, there is a possibility that he would be indicted after he leaves office.

National identity

Roughly 84% of Taiwan's population descends from Han Chinese who migrated from mainland China between 1661 and 1895. Another significant fraction descends from Han Chinese who immigrated from mainland China in the 1940s and 1950s. But between 1895 and the present, Taiwan and mainland China have shared a common government for only 4 years. The shared cultural origin combined with several hundred years of geographical separation, some hundred years of political separation and foreign influences, as well as hostility between the rival Taiwan and China have resulted in national identity being a contentious issue with political overtones. Since democratization and the lifting of martial law, a distinct Taiwanese identity (as opposed to Taiwanese identity as a subset of a Chinese identity) is often at the heart of political debates. Its acceptance makes the island distinct from mainland China, and therefore may be seen as a step towards forming a consensus for de jure Taiwan independence. The pan-green camp supports a distinct Taiwanese identity, while the pan-blue camp supports a Chinese identity only. The KMT has downplayed this stance in the recent years and now supports a Taiwanese identity as part of a Chinese identity.

According to a survey conducted in March 2009, 49% of the respondents consider themselves as Taiwanese only, and 44% of the respondents consider themselves as Taiwanese and Chinese. 3% consider themselves as only Chinese. Another survey, conducted in Taiwan in July 2009, showed that 82.8% of respondents consider that Taiwan and China are two separate countries developing each on its own. A recent survey conducted in December 2009 showed that 62% of the respondents consider themselves as Taiwanese only, and 22% of the respondents consider themselves as both Taiwanese and Chinese. 8% consider themselves as only Chinese. The survey also shows that among 18- to 29-year-old respondents, 75% consider themselves as Taiwanese only.

Government 

|President
|Tsai Ing-wen
|Democratic Progressive Party
|20 May 2016
|-
|Vice President
|Lai Ching-te
|Democratic Progressive Party
|20 May 2020
|-
|President of the Executive Yuan
|Chen Chien-jen
|Democratic Progressive Party
|31 January 2023
|-
|President of the Legislative Yuan
|Yu Shyi-kun
|Democratic Progressive Party
|1 February 2020
|-
|President of the Judicial Yuan
|Hsu Tzong-li
|Independent
|1 November 2016
|-
|President of the Examination Yuan
|Huang Jong-tsun
|Independent
|1 September 2020
|-
|President of the Control Yuan
|Chen Chu
|Democratic Progressive Party
|1 August 2020
|}

Presidency

The President is the head of state of the Republic of China and commander-in-chief of the armed forces. The president has authority over the five administrative branches (Yuan): Executive, Legislative, Control, Judicial, and Examination.

National Assembly

The National Assembly of the Republic of China was elected in mainland China in 1947 to officially carry out the duties of choosing the president, to amend the constitution, and to exercise the sovereignty of the citizens, but in actuality, the Assembly's role in Taipei seemed to reconfirm the executive powers of President Chang Kai-shek. The National Assembly was re-established on Taiwan when the government moved. Because it was impossible to hold subsequent elections to represent constituencies in mainland China, representatives elected in 1947–48 held these seats "indefinitely." In June 1990, however, the Council of Grand Justices mandated the retirement, effective December 1991, of all remaining "indefinitely" elected members of the National Assembly, Legislative Yuan, and other bodies.

The second National Assembly, elected in 1991, was composed of 325 members. The majority was elected directly; 100 were chosen from party slates in proportion to the popular vote. This National Assembly amended the constitution in 1994, paving the way for the direct election of the president and vice president that was held in March, 1996. The National Assembly retained the authority to amend the constitution, to recall or to impeach the president or vice president, and to ratify select senior-level presidential appointments. In April 2000, the members of the National Assembly voted to permit their terms of office to expire without holding new elections. They also determined that such an election would be called in the event the National Assembly is needed to decide a presidential recall or a constitutional amendment. In recent years, the National Assembly has handed most of its powers to the Legislative Yuan, including the power of impeachment. In 2005, the National Assembly permanently abolished itself by ratifying a constitution amendment passed by the Legislative Yuan.

Amending the ROC constitution now requires the approval of three-fourths of the quorum of members of the Legislative Yuan. This quorum requires at least three-fourths of all members of the Legislature. After passing by the legislature, the amendment needs ratification from at least fifty percent of all eligible voters of the ROC regardless of voter turnout.

Executive Yuan

The Executive Yuan comprises the premier, vice-premier, and the cabinet members who are responsible for policy and administration. The President of the Republic appoints the Premier, who is officially the President of the Executive Yuan.

Legislative Yuan

The main lawmaking body, the Legislative Yuan (LY), was originally elected in 1947. The first LY had 773 seats and was viewed as a "rubber stamp" institution. Like the National Assembly, representatives elected in 1947–48 held these seats "indefinitely" until the 1991 ruling. The second LY was elected in 1992. The third LY, elected in 1995, had 157 members serving 3-year terms. The fourth LY, elected in 1998, was expanded to 225 members. The LY has greatly enhanced its standing in relation to the Executive Yuan and has established itself as an important player on the central level. Along with increasing strength and size this body is beginning to reflect the recently liberalized political system. In the 1992 and 1995 elections, the main opposition partythe Democratic Progressive Party (DPP)challenged the KMT dominance of the Legislature. In both elections the DPP won a significant share of the LY seats, and the KMT held only half the seats in the LY. In 1998, however, the KMT increased its LY majority from 50% to 55% and continued to play a dominant role in the legislature as the leading opposition party. In the 2001 election, the DPP became the largest party after large losses suffered by the KMT. Control of the Yuan swung back to the KMT after the 2008 elections, while in 2016 the DPP regained the status as the largest party and achieved a majority for the first time in history.

Judicial Yuan

The Judicial Yuan (JY) administers the ROC's court system. It includes a 15-member Council of Grand Justices (COGJ) that interprets the constitution. Grand Justices are appointed by the President, with the consent of the Legislative Yuan, to 8-year terms.

Control Yuan

The Control Yuan (CY) was elected in 1947 by provincial legislatures. The current form since 1993 monitors the efficiency of public service and investigates instances of corruption. The 29 Control Yuan members are appointed by the president and approved by the Legislative Yuan; they serve 6-year terms. In recent years, the Control Yuan has become more active, and it has conducted several major investigations and impeachments. The current president of the Control Yuan is Chang Po-ya.

Examination Yuan

The Examination Yuan (ExY) functions as a civil service commission and includes two ministries: the Ministry of Examination, which recruits officials through competitive examination, and the Ministry of Personnel, which manages the civil service. The President appoints the Examination Yuan's President.
The current President of the Examination Yuan is Wu Jin-lin.

Political parties and elections

Recent elections

Presidential elections

Legislative elections

Political parties 
As of July 2015, there are 277 officially registered parties in Taiwan. The aftermath of the 2000 Presidential election and the 2001 legislative election left the Taiwan fragmented among several political parties. These parties can be divided into "blue" factions (Pan-Blue Coalition) and "green" factions (Pan-Green Coalition), with the "blue" faction tending toward unification and a national identity that is linked with China and the "green" faction leaning toward a national identity based on Taiwan independence which is separate from the Chinese national identity. The complex structure of the party system in Taiwan was also influenced by the voting system which uses single non-transferable vote for legislative elections and first past the post for executive elections. Starting with the 2008 legislative elections, the SNTV system was discarded in favor of a mixed single member district (SMD) with proportional representation based on national party votes, similar to Japan.

The "blue" faction comes from the color of the KMT and includes the KMT, the People First Party, and the New Party. The "green" faction comes from the color of the Democratic Progressive Party and includes the Democratic Progressive Party and the Taiwan Statebuilding Party.

 Democratic Progressive Party 
After 1986, the KMT's hold on power was challenged by the emergence of competing political parties. Before 1986, candidates opposing the KMT ran in elections as independents or "nonpartisans." Before the 1986 island-wide elections many "nonpartisans" grouped together to create Taiwan's first opposition party, the Democratic Progressive Party (DPP). Despite the official ban on forming new political parties, the government authorities did not prohibit the DPP from operating, and in the 1986 elections DPP and independent candidates captured more than 20% of the vote.

The Civic Organizations Law passed in 1989 allowed for the formation of new political parties, thereby legalizing the DPP, and its support and influence increased. In the 1992 Legislative Yuan elections, the DPP won 51 seats in the 161-seat body. While this was only half the number of KMT seats, it made the DPP's voice an important factor in legislative decisions. Winning the Taipei mayor's position in December 1994, significantly enhanced the DPP's image. The DPP continued its strong showing in the 1995 LY race, winning 45 of the 157 seats to the KMT's 81. The DPP for the first time succeeded in outpolling the KMT in the November 1997 local elections, gaining 12 of the 23 magistrate and mayoral seats as opposed to the KMT's 8 and winning 43% of the vote versus the KMT's 41%.

The DPP membership is made up largely of the Hoklo people, the largest ethnic group in Taiwan. The DPP maintains that Taiwan is an entity separate from mainland China and supports an independent "Republic of Taiwan" as part of its platform. The recent downplaying of Taiwan independence by the DPP as a party, however, led to the formation by hard-line advocates of a new political party called the Taiwan Independence Party in December 1996.

 Kuomintang 
Until 1986, Taiwan's political system was effectively controlled by one party, the KMT, the leader of which also was the President. Many top political officials were members of the party. The party claimed over 2 million members, and its net assets were reputed to total more than NT $61.2 billion, making it the richest political party in the world.

 New Power Party 
The New Power Party was formed in early 2015. The party emerged from the Sunflower Student Movement in 2014, and advocates for universal human rights, civil and political liberties, as well as Taiwan independence/nationalism. The NPP currently had 3 members in the LY.

 Taiwan Statebuilding Party 
The Taiwan Statebuilding Party which advocates Taiwan independence and the party is considered a close ally of the Democratic Progressive Party. The TSP was formed primarily because, as it took power, the DPP had to moderate its standing as regards to Taiwan independence, leaving a hole in the Taiwanese political spectrum.

 People First Party 
A new opposition party was formed in the wake of the March 2000 presidential election by the runner up, a KMT maverick candidate. The People's First Party is composed primarily of former KMT and NP members who supported former KMT Taiwan Provincial Governor James Soong's presidential bid. The PFP currently had 17 members in the LY before the 2001 election, but increased its representation to over 40 in that election.

 New Party 
The New Party was formed in August 1993 by a group made up largely of second-generation mainlander KMT members who were unhappy both with corruption in the KMT and with what they saw as the "Taiwanization" of KMT ideology and leadership. The NP emphasizes "clean government" and the original KMT focus on unification with mainland China. NP influence remains modest and seems on the wane; it won 21 of the 164 LY seats in the 1995 elections but only 11 of 225 seats in 1998. The New Party was almost annihilated in the 2001 election as its members defected to the Peoples First Party.

 Taiwan Solidarity Union 
In 2001, supporters of former President Lee founded the Taiwan Solidarity Union (TSU). Even though Lee did not join this party, he is named its spiritual leader and most believe he endorsed it. The TSU was formed primarily because, as it took power, the DPP had to moderate its standing as regards to Taiwan independence, leaving a hole in the Taiwanese political spectrum. In a bid to help the "green" side achieve control in the Legislative Yuan, the TSU was formed to attract the radical votes left over from DPP and the localist support for KMT. The TSU had often expressed that it wanted to be the "decisive minority".

Other parties than the parties listed above include:
 Taiwan Number One Party
 New Nation Association
 Democratic Alliance
 Natural Law Party
 Taiwan Independence Party
 Green Party Taiwan
 Non-Party Alliance
 Farmers' Party
 Chinese Liberal Democratic Party
 Labor Party
 Third Society Party

Although some friction between 1949 Chinese immigrants and native Taiwanese still exists, it has abated with time, and there has been a gradual melding of the two communities. In 1972, then-Premier Chiang Ching-kuo began a concentrated effort to bring Taiwanese into more senior position in the central administration and the KMT. Upon his accession to the presidency in January 1988, Lee Teng-hui, who is a native Taiwanese, continued this process. Steps by the government to redress past wrongs such as setting up a memorial to the victims of the February 28 Incident have contributed to this process.

Political conditions 

Changes in the political process were the result of the liberalizing trend that began in the 1980s under President Chiang Ching-kuo. In 1987, he lifted the emergency decree, which had been in place since 1948 and which had granted virtually unlimited powers to the president for use in the anti-communist campaign. This decree provided the basis for nearly four decades of martial law under which individuals and groups expressing dissenting views were dealt with harshly. Expressing views contrary to the authorities' claim to represent all of China or supporting independent Taiwan independence was treated as sedition. Vice-President Lee Teng-hui succeeded Chiang Ching-kuo as president when Chiang died on 13 January 1988. Lee was elected by the National Assembly to a 6-year term in 1990, marking the final time a president was elected by the National Assembly.

Since ending martial law, the Republic of China has taken dramatic steps to improve respect for human rights and create a democratic political system. Most restrictions on the press have ended, restrictions on personal freedoms have been relaxed, and the prohibition against organizing new political parties has been lifted.

As the National Assembly took action in 1994 to allow for the popular election of the president, the LY in 1994 passed legislation to allow for the direct election of the governor of Taiwan Province and the mayors of Taipei and Kaohsiung Municipalities. These elections were held in December 1994, with the KMT winning the governor and Kaohsiung mayor posts, and the DPP winning the Taipei mayor's position. In March 1996, Lee Teng-hui was elected president and Lien Chan vice president in the first direct election by Taiwan's voters. In 1998, the KMT's Ma Ying-jeou wrestled back control of the mayorship of Taipei from the opposition DPP's most prominent figure Chen Shui-bian. In the same elections, however, the DPP's Frank Hsieh managed to defeat Kaoshiung's KMT incumbent.

The position of elected governor and many other elements of the Taiwan Provincial Government were eliminated at the end of 1998. The stated purpose of this was to streamline administrative efficiency, but some commentators have argued that this was also intended to weaken the power base of Governor James Soong. In November 1997 local elections, the DPP won 12 of the 23 county magistrate and city mayor contests to the KMT's 8, outpolling the KMT for the first time in a major election.

In March 2000, Democratic Progressive Party candidate Chen Shui-bian became the first opposition party candidate to win the presidency. His victory resulted in the first-ever transition of the presidential office from one political party to another in the ROC. The election also had the effect of splitting the KMT's support base. James Soong launched an independent bid for the presidency after failing to be nominated by the party. In response the KMT expelled Soong and his supporters. Soong and his supporters blamed then-KMT Chairman Lee Teng-hui of harboring pro-independence sentiments and purposely trying to aid Chen Shui-bian by splitting the KMT's vote by running the less charismatic Lien Chan along with Soong. After losing the vote narrowly to Chen and ahead of Lien, Soong established the People First Party. Lee Teng-hui was soon forced out of the KMT Chairmanship amid popular protests and riots demanding he take responsibility for the KMT's defeat.

In the months following the 2000 presidential election, Lee Teng-hui's supporters established the Taiwan Solidarity Union, which advocated a more radical brand of Taiwan independence than the DPP. For this, Lee was expelled from the KMT and the KMT gradually moved itself to a more conservative and pro-unification position. This permitted the formation of two rival coalitions that have since dominated Taiwanese politics: the Pan-Blue Coalition formed by the KMT, People First Party, and New Party and the Pan-Green Coalition formed by the Democratic Progressive Party and Taiwan Solidarity Union.

In the 2001 LY elections, the DPP won a plurality of seats for the first time. However, the Pan-Blue Coalition held a small majority over the Pan-Green Coalition, causing much of President Chen's agenda to be derailed. This also gave independents in the legislature more power, some of whom founded the Non-Partisan Solidarity Union in 2004.

In a hotly contested election on 20 March 2004, President Chen Shui-bian was re-elected by 50.1% of the popular vote to a second term. The election was marred by a shooting incident the day before the election during which President Chen and his running mate Vice President Annette Lu were slightly wounded. While the opposition contested the results and suggested the shooting was staged to win sympathy (as President Chen had previously been slated to lose narrowly), it was the first time that the DPP has won an outright majority in an island-wide election.

The March election also included a "peace referendum". Historically, the issue of referendums has been closely tied to the question of Taiwan independence, and thus has been a sensitive issue in cross Strait relations. There were two referendums before the voters on 20 March 2004. The first asked in light of the PRC missile threat whether the ROC should purchase anti-missile systems. The second asked whether Taiwan should adopt a "peace framework" for addressing cross Strait differences with the PRC. However both referendums failed to obtain support from over 50% of registered voters, as required to be valid. The Pan-Blue Coalition campaigned against the referendum as unnecessary and urged voters to boycott it.

President Chen Shui-bian has called for major constitutional reforms by 2006 aimed at further reducing layers of government, and making other structural changes aimed at improving governance. The People's Republic of China has accused Chen of using the constitution issue to move Taiwan towards independence. He expressed opposition, however, in his 20 May 2004 inaugural address to using constitutional reform to alter the constitution's definition of Taiwan sovereignty.

The Legislative Yuan passed a set of constitutional amendments on 23 August 2004 that halve the number of LY seats and create single-member districts. The revisions also eliminate the role of the National Assembly and permit the public to confirm or reject future revisions passed by the LY. These constitutional amendments were ratified by the National Assembly in 2005.

Prior to the 11 December 2004 elections to the Legislative Yuan, signs indicated that the DPP would for the first time dominate the Legislative Yuan. Polls projected a huge pan-green victory, and the DPP's election tactics were based on them. This over-reliance on polls resulted in a huge setback. The pan-blue opposition managed to maintain their majority status within the Legislative Yuan, winning 114 seats out of the 225 seats. The Pan-Green only managed to win 101 seats. The remaining 10 seats were won by the independent candidates. Although the Pan-Green coalition increased their seats by one and the DPP remained the largest party, because of raised hopes the election was viewed as a disaster, and President Chen resigned his post as Chairman of DPP as a result.

On 3 December 2005, the KMT made major gains in municipal elections, taking 14 of 23 mayor or county magistrate seats, while the DPP retained only six seats of their previous 10. The pan-blue People First Party and New Party each took one seat, and an independent won one seat. The pan-green TSU was completely shut out. DPP chairman Su Tseng-chang had promised to resign to take responsibility for the defeat. This dramatic setback for the DPP and pan-greens was seen as a reaction to recent corruption scandals, and public disapproval of Chen Shui-Bian's apparent refusal to improve cross-strait relations.

A. M. Rosenthal, former executive editor of The New York Times accused China of fostering an "apartheid" policy toward Taiwan. Dr Tan Sun Chen, Taiwan's Minister of Foreign Affairs, asserts that China's obstruction in the international community has led to a "political apartheid" which "harms the human rights, interests, and dignity of Taiwan's people.".

ROC and PRC 

Despite the differences between Taiwan and mainland China, contact between the two sides of the Taiwan Strait has grown significantly over the past decade. The ROC has continued to relax restrictions on unofficial contacts with the PRC, and cross-Strait interaction has mushroomed. Since 1987, when the ban on travel to mainland China was lifted, Taiwan residents have made more than 10 million trips to mainland China. The ROC Bureau of Foreign Trade estimates that indirect trade with mainland China reached about US$61.639 billion, or 18% of the total trade of the ROC, in 2004. This indirect trade runs heavily in Taiwan's favor, providing another outlet for the island's booming economy. In an attempt to facilitate trade, in 1995 the Executive Yuan approved the construction of an offshore transshipment center at the port of Kaohsiung through which direct shipping with the mainland would be permitted. In April 1997 the first sanctioned direct cross-Strait shipping began between selected mainland China ports and Kaohsiung for cargo being transshipped through Taiwan.

Beijing has expressed a mixed view of these developments. PRC leaders are pleased at the development of economic ties and exchanges, which they believe helps their cause of unification. However, the increase in contacts, combined with domestic political liberalization on Taiwan, also has resulted in more open discussion in Taiwan of the future of Taiwan, including the option of independence, to which Beijing is strongly opposed.

When Lee Teng-hui visited his alma mater in the US in 1995, this caused harsh criticism from the PRC, which ultimately led to the Third Taiwan Strait Crisis. Lee Teng-hui's characterization in 1999 of relations between the ROC and mainland China as "between two states" was denounced by the Chinese government; Lee partially changed his earlier statement and referred to the 1992 consensus between the ROC and the PRC. Taiwan business representatives have concerns about issues such as safety, corruption, and contract disputes, which have led to increased caution and a search for alternative investment venues but not to pulling out from mainland China altogether. President Chen has yet to revise the previous administration's "no haste, be patient" policy regarding Taiwan-mainland China investment to prevent over-dependence on the PRC. As a result of this policy the ROC placed restrictions on large-scale infrastructure investments on mainland China in 1997.

The development of semi official cross-Strait relations has been incremental. Prior to April 1993, when talks were held in Singapore between the heads of two private intermediary organizationsTaiwan's Straits Exchange Foundation (SEF) and the PRC's Association for Relations Across the Taiwan Straits (ARATS)there had been some lower-level exchanges between the two sides of the Strait. The April 1993 SEF-ARATS talks primarily addressed technical issues relating to cross-Strait interactions. Lower-level talks continued on a fairly regular basis until they were suspended by Beijing in 1995 after President Lee's U.S. visit. Unofficial exchanges resumed in 1997 through informal meetings between personnel of the two sides' unofficial representative organizations. Direct SEF-ARATS contacts resumed in April 1998, and the SEF Chairman visited mainland China in October 1998. A planned visit by ARATS Chairman Wang Daohan to Taiwan in the fall, however, was postponed following statements made by then-President Lee Teng-hui that relations between mainland China and Taiwan should be conducted as "state-to-state" or at least as "special state-to-state relations." Since his 20 May 2000 inauguration, President Chen has called for resuming the cross-Strait dialogue without any preconditions. President Chen has stated that such talks should be conducted on the basis of the "spirit of 1992," a reference to the agreement to hold the 1993 Singapore talks. The PRC, however, has insisted that President Chen must recognize the one China principle before talks can be held.

Administrative divisions 

The Republic of China currently administers the island of Taiwan (Formosa), Penghu (Pescadores), Kinmen (Quemoy) and Matsu Islands. The whole country is divided into two streamlined provinces (Taiwan and Fukien) and six special municipalities. Since the provinces are streamlined and the de facto dissolution of the provincial governments, the cities and counties are directly governed by the central government, namely Executive Yuan. The central governed administrative divisions are listed below
 Six special municipalities (直轄市 zhíxiáshì): Kaohsiung, New Taipei, Taichung, Tainan, Taipei, and Taoyuan.
 Two non-functioning provinces: Fukien and Taiwan
 Three provincial cities (市 shì): Chiayi, Keelung, Hsinchu.
 13 counties (縣 xiàn): Changhua, Chiayi, Hsinchu, Hualien, Kinmen, Lienchiang, Miaoli, Nantou, Penghu, Pingtung, Taitung, Yilan and Yunlin.

See also 
 Elections in Taiwan
 Foreign relations of Taiwan
 List of political parties in Taiwan
 Conservatism in Taiwan
 Politics of China
 Black gold (politics)
 Iron vote
 Legislative violence
 History of Taiwan

Notes

References

Further reading 
 Steve Tsang, The Cold War's Odd Couple: The Unintended Partnership between the Republic of China and the UK. I.B. Tauris, 2006. .
 Steve Tsang (ed.), If China Attacks Taiwan: Military strategy, politics and economics. Routledge, 2006. .

Politics of the Republic of China
Political parties